One Way Out is a live album by the Allman Brothers Band. It is the first live album to feature Warren Haynes and Derek Trucks together, although both had appeared separately on previous live albums. It was recorded during the group's annual Beacon Theatre run in New York City on March 25 and 26, 2003, and released a year later. This would be the final album released by the band before they disbanded in 2014.

The live version of "Instrumental Illness" was nominated for Best Rock Instrumental Performance at the 47th Annual Grammy Awards, but it lost to "Mrs. O'Leary's Cow" by Brian Wilson.

Reception
Writer Robert Christgau awarded the album an A− rating, calling it the Allman Brothers Band's "best live album of their career because both age and youth suit them, and because [...] they're better now than they ever were". Thom Jurek, writing for AllMusic, praised the album's production, comparing the sound quality to that of a live performance and writing that the "listener is in the mix, not in front of it". Jurek additionally stated that the album "is essential for anyone interested in rock & roll".

In an article for All About Jazz, C. Michael Bailey commented on the novelty of the music, favorably comparing the Allman Brothers Band to others in the jam band movement, 1970s pop radio, and American rock band Little Feat. Bailey specifically praised the band for "completely reconstitut[ing] into units making new music as opposed to simply recapitulating the old". In a separate article for the same publication, Doug Collette called the album "without doubt the document of a truly great rock and roll ensemble playing with as much fire as finesse", and commented on the collaborative nature of the album's production and its improvisational style.

Writing for PopMatters, Adam Williams wrote that One Way Out is "flawless in all respects" and that "all doubts are dispelled as to who the finest live jammers are [...] the Allmans and the Beacon have become synonymous with extended play brilliance."

Track listing 

Disc one
"Statesboro Blues" (Blind Willie McTell) – 5:22
"Don't Keep Me Wonderin'" (Gregg Allman) – 4:12
"Midnight Rider" (Gregg Allman, Robert Payne) – 3:16
"Rockin' Horse" (Gregg Allman, Warren Haynes, Allen Woody, Jack Pearson) – 10:12
"Desdemona" (Gregg Allman, Warren Haynes) – 13:27
"Trouble No More" (Muddy Waters) – 3:45
"Wasted Words" (Gregg Allman) – 7:51
"Good Morning Little Schoolgirl" (Sonny Boy Williamson) – 9:01
"Instrumental Illness" (Warren Haynes, Oteil Burbridge) – 16:42 (with 5:36 drum solo)

Disc two
"Ain't Wastin' Time No More" (Gregg Allman) – 6:29
"Come and Go Blues" (Gregg Allman) – 6:03
"Woman Across the River" (Bettye Crutcher, Allen Jones) – 6:38
"Old Before My Time" (Gregg Allman, Warren Haynes) – 5:37
"Every Hungry Woman" (Gregg Allman) – 5:21
"High Cost of Low Living" (Gregg Allman, Warren Haynes, Jeff Anders, Ronnie Burgin) – 8:42
"Worried Down with the Blues" (Warren Haynes, John Jaworowicz) – 7:58
"Dreams" (Gregg Allman) – 12:49
"Whipping Post" (Gregg Allman) – 15:31

Personnel 

The Allman Brothers Band
 Gregg Allman – Hammond B-3 organ, piano, coustic guitar, lead vocals
 Jaimoe – drums (left side)
 Butch Trucks – drums (right side)
 Warren Haynes – lead and slide guitars (right side), lead and background vocals
 Marc Quinones – congas, percussion, background vocals
 Oteil Burbridge – bass guitar
 Derek Trucks – lead and slide guitars (left side)

Production
 Producers: Michael Barbiero and Warren Haynes
 Recording and mixing: Michael Barbiero
 Assistant engineers: Mike Scielzi, Joel Singer
 Tape operator: Hardi Kamsani
 Stage: Brandon Karp
 Mastering: George Marino

Charts

References

2004 live albums
Sanctuary Records live albums
The Allman Brothers Band live albums